Bhesan can refer to three places in India.
Bhesan subdistrict, 
Bhesan, Surat, 
Bhesan village, Junagadh